Red-berry mistletoe is a common name for several species of plants and may refer to:

 Viscum cruciatum
 Viscum rotundifolium